This article displays the qualifying draw of the 1996 Direct Line International Championships.

Players

Seeds

  Karin Kschwendt (qualifying competition, lucky loser)
  Annie Miller (qualified)
  Tatjana Ječmenica (first round)
  Inés Gorrochategui (qualified)
  Melanie Schnell (second round)
  Tami Whitlinger-Jones (qualifying competition)
  Katrina Adams (second round)
  Nicole Arendt (qualified)

Qualifiers

  Nicole Arendt
  Inés Gorrochategui
  Nancy Feber
  Annie Miller

Qualifying draw

First qualifier

Second qualifier

Third qualifier

Fourth qualifier

References
 Drawsheet

Qualifying
Direct Line International Championships - qualifying